Vollmershain is a municipality in the Verwaltungsgemeinschaft of Oberes Sprottental in the Thuringian landkreis of Altenburger Land in Germany.

Geography

The town's site
The village of Vollmershain is located along 4 km of the Sprotte.  The highest part of the community is 306.2 m high on the side of the Mühlberg (308.1 m).

Neighbouring communities
Other municipalities near Vollmershain are Heukewalde, Jonaswalde, Posterstein, Nöbdenitz, Thonhausen, and the Weißbach district of Schmölln in the Landkreis of Altenburger Land.

History
The village was first mentioned in writing in 1181 in a tithe register of the Posau Cloister in Zeitz.
During the Thirty Years' War, the Swedish General Wrangel had his headquarters in the area around Vollmershain in 1646.
Within the German Empire (1871–1918), Vollmershein was part of the Duchy of Saxe-Altenburg.

References

Altenburger Land
Duchy of Saxe-Altenburg